The Blues Brothers Band Live in Montreux is an album by The Blues Brothers band. It was released  in 1990 on the heels of the band's reunion tour and it's the first album recorded by the band after the death of founding member John Belushi and the only one that doesn't feature Dan Aykroyd. Drummer Steve Jordan and keyboardist Paul Shaffer weren't available to play, and were replaced respectively by Danny Gottlieb and Leon Pendarvis. Vocals duties were assigned to Eddie Floyd and Larry Thurston, who had been previously recruited by Matt Murphy for his short-lived solo outfit Matt "Guitar" Murphy Band. As with most other records by the band, the album was recorded live. Along with regular numbers from the Blues Brothers repertoire, it features material never performed before by the band like "Hold On, I'm Comin'", (which, in its original rendition by Sam & Dave, was part of the Blues Brothers film soundtrack), "In the Midnight Hour", "The Thrill Is Gone", and two Eddie Floyd signature tunes, "Knock on Wood" and "Raise Your Hand". The album was produced by Tom Malone.

Track listing 
 "Hold On, I'm Comin'"
 "In the Midnight Hour"
 "She Caught the Katy"
 "The Thrill Is Gone"
 "Can't Turn You Loose"
 "Sweet Home Chicago"
 "Knock on Wood"
 "Raise Your Hand"
 "Peter Gunn Theme"
 "Soul Finger"
 "Hey Bartender"
 "Soul Man"
 "Everybody Needs Somebody to Love" (not on L.P and Cassette)  
 "Green Onions" (not on L.P.and Cassette)

Credits 
Eddie Floyd – lead vocals
Larry Thurston – lead vocals
Steve "The Colonel" Cropper – guitar
Donald "Duck" Dunn – bass guitar
Lou "Blue Lou" Marini – tenor saxophone, alto saxophone
Matt "Guitar" Murphy – lead guitar
Alan "Mr. Fabulous" Rubin – trumpet
Tom Malone – trombone
Danny Gottlieb – drums
Leon Pendarvis – keyboards, piano, background vocals, music director

1990 live albums
The Blues Brothers albums